The 2014–15 NLEX Road Warriors season was the first season of the franchise (after buying Air21)  in the Philippine Basketball Association (PBA).

Key dates
August 24: The 2014 PBA Draft took place in Midtown Atrium, Robinson Place Manila.

Draft picks

Roster

Philippine Cup

Eliminations

Standings

Game log

Playoffs

Bracket

Commissioner's Cup

Eliminations

Standings

Game log

Playoffs

Bracket

Governors' Cup

Eliminations

Standings

Bracket

Game log

Transactions

Trades

Pre-season

Philippine Cup

Recruited imports

(* Asian import)

References

NLEX Road Warriors seasons
NLEX